was a Japanese rock band active from 1995 to 2005, who made their debut in 1997. Consisting of composer and vocalist Kōji Nakamura (中村弘二 Nakamura Kōji), lyricist and guitarist Junji Ishiwatari (いしわたり淳治 Ishiwatari Junji), bassist Miki Furukawa (フルカワミキ Furukawa Miki), and drummer Kōdai Tazawa (田沢公大 Tazawa Kōdai), Supercar is best known for combining alternative rock with electronic music and has been characterized as having an "almost foundational importance to 21st century Japanese indie rock". Internationally, Supercar is also known for providing much of the soundtrack for the Japanese film Ping Pong, as well as being featured in the anime series Eureka Seven.

History 
Hailing from Aomori Prefecture, Supercar was formed in 1995 when bassist Miki Furukawa placed an advertisement in a local magazine seeking fellow musicians.  Junji Ishiwatari responded and convinced childhood friend Kōji Nakamura to join as well. Junji and Kōji soon recruited drummer Kōdai Tazawa, an acquaintance from middle school.  While still in high school, they began writing songs starting with the singles DRIVE and (Am I) confusing you?

After writing songs and recording demo tapes, the group received a record contract in 1995. By 1997, they had released two singles (cream soda and Lucky) and were working on their first album.  In 1998 they released their influential debut album, Three Out Change. Music critic Ian Martin has described it as an "epic indie rock/shoegaze album" and "one of the all-time great Japanese rock albums."  Later that year, they went on their first national tour.

Supercar's second album, Jump Up, was released in 1999 shortly after the group members had moved to Tokyo from Aomori. With the 2000 album Futurama, electronic experimentation took a larger role that would characterize the band's sound for the rest of their career. During the summer of 2001, the group performed at both the Fuji Rock Festival and Rock in Japan Festival. The 2002 release Highvision continued the electronic development, and the single Strobolights did not even contain a guitar. 

Supercar released its last non-compilation album, Answer in 2004. Perhaps their most experimental album, Answer contained balance of both rock and electronica.  In July of that year, they played at the Fuji Rock Festival for the third and final time.

In February 2005, Supercar broke up following a final concert, released under DVD as Last Live.  Later that year, their song "Storywriter" featured in the anime Eureka Seven.  Following the breakup, Furukawa and Nakamura have pursued successful solo careers.

Despite the break-up, Supercar released two remix albums named RE:SUPERCAR 1 and RE:SUPERCAR 2 in 2011. The albums are redesigned versions of some of their tracks throughout their career together with never before heard songs. The limited edition of these albums sported a different CD jacket and bonus CD containing some of their untitled tracks and demos.

In 2011, Miki Furukawa and Koji Nakamura formed the band LAMA. They jump-started their formation with a single entitled Spell which has been used as an opening theme for the anime No.6 and in addition to this they will also perform the ending theme entitled "Fantasy" for the anime UN-GO.

Members
 – lead vocals, rhythm guitar & synthesizer; Composer
 After a solo career under the name of NYANTORA or iLL, he formed LAMA with Furukawa currently.
 – lead guitar, synthesizer; Lyricist
 After the band broke up, he has written lyrics for various musicians and bands or has produced them.
 – bass guitar, synthesizer, vocals
 – drums
 After the band broke up, he formed aM™[aem], who have had multiple songs feature in Gran Turismo 5 and 6.

Discography

Albums

Studio albums

Compilation albums

Singles 
 "Cream Soda" (September 21, 1997)
 "Planet" (December 1, 1997)
 "Lucky" (March 1, 1998)
 "Drive" (May 21, 1998)
 "Sunday People" (September 21, 1998)
 "My Girl" (February 3, 1999)
 "Love Forever" (May 21, 1999)
 "Fairway" (February 2, 2000)
 "White Surf Style 5" (October 12, 2000)
 "Strobolights" (May 23, 2001)
 "Yumegiwa Last Boy" (November 21, 2001)
 "Aoharu Youth" (February 6, 2002)
 "Recreation" (February 14, 2003)
 "BGM" (November 19, 2003)
 "Last Scene" (January 28, 2004)
 "Wonder Word EP" (April 28, 2004)

DVDs 
 High Booster + U.N. VJ Works (November 19, 2002)
 P.V.D. (November 20, 2002)
 P.V.D. 2 (November 20, 2002)
 Last Live Kanzen-ban (LAST LIVE 完全版 Last Live: Complete Edition) (June 29, 2005)
 P.V.D. Complete 10th Anniversary Edition (April 4, 2007)

References

External links 
 Official site - Sony Japan
 Remix Album Special Site  -
 Lyrics - Lyrics translated to English

Japanese musical groups
Japanese indie rock groups
Japanese electronic rock musical groups
Japanese alternative rock groups
Japanese experimental rock groups
Shoegazing musical groups
Musical quartets
Ki/oon Music artists
Musical groups from Aomori Prefecture
Musical groups established in 1995
Musical groups disestablished in 2005